FC Ulaanbaatar is a professional football club based in Ulaanbaatar, Mongolia. Club currently competes in top national division, Mongolian National Premier League.

History
FC Ulaanbaatar was founded in 2010. Included on the team's roster were the striker Kim Myong-Won who participated in the 2010 FIFA World Cup from the Democratic People's Republic of Korea. In 2011, the club won its first Mongolian Premier League title.

Domestic history

Honours
 Mongolia Premier League: (1)
 Winner : 2011
 Runner-up  : 2015, 2018, 2020, 2022
 Mongolia Super Cup: (1)
 Runner-up : 2011
Winner: 2021
 Federation Cup:
 Runner-up : 2017

References

External links 
 Official site
 Mongolian Football Federation profile 

Football clubs in Mongolia
2010 establishments in Mongolia
Association football clubs established in 2010